Les paumées du petit matin (English: The Escapees,  The Dawns of the Early Morning, also known as The Runaways) is a 1981 drama film directed by Jean Rollin. A drama, it maintained the fairytale and romantic qualities of Rollin's earlier films Requiem pour un Vampire, Fascination and La Nuit des Traquées, but departed from his usual horror themes.

Synopsis
The story begins in a mental asylum run by nuns. Michelle, a troubled teenager, has been returned to the asylum after escaping and is put in a straitjacket and then locked in a room. She manages to get the attention of a new patient, Marie, a quiet girl who just seems to sit in the garden in a rocking chair. Marie helps Michelle by removing her straitjacket, and the pair run off together. At first, Michelle wants to leave on her own, but Marie wants to go with her and the two form a tenuous friendship. They follow a group of burlesque dancers who they encounter in an old scrapyard as they roam the countryside. They befriend a thief named Sophie, who helps them escape when the burlesque show is busted. Ending up in a shipyard, they connect with bar owner Madame Louise, who takes in runaways. Sophie convinces her sailor boyfriend to not only stow her away for the next voyage, but the other two as well. Marie and Michelle later meet two men and two women at Louise's, who take them away to a mansion and try to rape Marie, so they kill the people. When the police arrive, a gun battle ensues, and with their last two bullets, Michelle and Marie share a kiss before fulfilling their suicide pact. Marie, however, can't bring herself to pull the trigger, so Michelle walks out holding her body. Michelle walks down to the water with Marie's body. Sophie couldn't leave her friends behind, and had already left the ship. She's placed in handcuffs for an earlier pickpocketing episode, but runs and jumps off the dock to her death onto some pontoons floating below.

Home media
VHS releases of Les Paumées du Petit Matin were only available in some countries, such as France, Canada and Turkey.

A DVD edition was released 26 January 2009 by Redemption Films in the UK, and 31 March 2009 by Salvation Films in the US. These DVD editions included an interview with Rollin which runs for almost an hour where he discusses the film and other works.

The film was released on Blu-ray on 26 May 2015 by Redemption. For the first time, the film was remastered in HD from the original 35 mm negative.

References

External links

1981 films
French drama films
Films directed by Jean Rollin
LGBT-related drama films
1981 LGBT-related films
1980s French-language films
French LGBT-related films